"Silent Storm" is a song by Norwegian singer and songwriter Carl Espen, released as a single on 18 February 2014. It represented Norway in the Eurovision Song Contest 2014 in Copenhagen, Denmark. It was performed during the second semi-final on 8 May 2014, and qualified for the final. It placed sixth in the semi-final with 77 points and finished in eighth place with 88 points overall.

Eurovision Song Contest

The song was selected to represent Norway in the Eurovision Song Contest 2014, after Espen was chosen through Melodi Grand Prix 2014, the music competition that selects Norway's entries for the Eurovision Song Contest. On 20 January 2014, a special allocation draw was held which placed each country into one of the two semi-finals, as well as which half of the show they would perform in. Norway was placed into the second semi-final, which was held on 8 May 2014, and was scheduled to perform in the first half of the show. After all the competing songs for the 2014 contest had been released, the running order for the semi-finals was decided by the show's producers rather than through another draw, so that similar songs were not placed next to each other. Norway performed in position 3, and qualified for the final, which took place on 10 May 2014. It placed sixth in the semi-final with 77 points and overall finished in eighth place with 88 points.

Charts

Certifications

References 

2014 singles
RCA Records albums
Eurovision songs of 2014
Eurovision songs of Norway